NetherRealm Studios (stylized as NetheЯRealm Studios) is an American video game developer based in Chicago and owned by Warner Bros. Games. Led by video game industry veteran and Mortal Kombat co-creator Ed Boon, the studio is in charge of developing the Mortal Kombat and Injustice series of fighting games.

History 
On February 12, 2009, Midway Games filed for Chapter 11 bankruptcy in the United States. Warner Bros. subsequently acquired "substantially all of the assets", including Mortal Kombat, This Is Vegas and the Midway Games company structure, on July 10, 2009. While Warner Bros. went on to close most of Midway Games' Chicago headquarters and San Diego, California and Liverpool, England, development studios, they retained the Midway Games Chicago development studio, which became part of Warner Bros. Interactive Entertainment (now Warner Bros. Games). The remaining studio was renamed WB Games Chicago several days later. On April 20, 2010, the studio was reincorporated as NetherRealm Studios, replacing WB Games Chicago.

NetherRealm Studios' first game, was the ninth installment in the Mortal Kombat series, the title was released in April 2011. Their first game original intellectual property, Injustice: Gods Among Us, based on the DC Universe, was released in 2013. The success of the two games allowed the development of respective sequels; Mortal Kombat X in 2015 and Injustice 2 in 2017. Also, NetherRealm developed Android and iOS versions for Batman: Arkham City Lockdown, Batman: Arkham Origins, and WWE Immortals. The company's latest release, Mortal Kombat 11, was released on April 23, 2019. On October 18, 2022, NetherRealm announced that, they are working on Mortal Kombat: Onslaught. It's a cinematic collection role-playing mobile game and will be released in 2023.

On February 2023, Warner Bros CEO David Zaslav announced that Mortal Kombat 12 is in development at NRS and is slated to be released later this year.

Games developed

Controversies
Shortly after the launch of Mortal Kombat 11, several independent declarations from former employees came through about the studio's alleged practices and general working conditions during the development of their last four games, in what they described as a toxic workplace with common instances of gender discrimination, as well as severe crunch time. In May 2019, NetherRealm released a statement saying "At NetherRealm Studios, we greatly appreciate and respect all of our employees and prioritize creating a positive work experience. As an equal opportunity employer, we encourage diversity and constantly take steps to reduce crunch time for our employees. We are actively looking into all allegations, as we take these matters very seriously and are always working to improve our company environment. There are confidential ways for employees to raise any concerns or issues." Following the statement, NetherRealm gave the studio the weekend off.

The same month, another article by Kotaku reported on the mental toll the developers were taking on by developing such excessively violent video games—one developer detailed stories about how the team would view pictures and videos of murders or animal slaughter as reference material, which would cause nightmares and eventual insomnia, with a diagnosis of post-traumatic stress disorder.

References

External links 
 

2010 establishments in Illinois
American companies established in 2010
Companies based in Chicago
Mortal Kombat
Video game companies established in 2010
Video game companies of the United States
Video game development companies
Warner Bros. Games